Jaiden Dittfach (born September 27, 1997), known online as Jaiden Animations, is an American YouTuber and animator, known for her story-time animations. Her videos explore a variety of topics, spanning from her experiences to personal stories. She now mainly creates videos centered around video game stories.

Dittfach's four YouTube channels have collectively amassed over  million subscribers and over  billion views  At the 10th Streamy Awards in 2020, she received a Streamy Award in the Animated category. She was previously nominated for the award in 2018.

YouTube career

Early career
Prior to working on her own channel, Dittfach worked with other YouTubers on their channels, including iHasCupquake.

Eponymous channel

Dittfach created her YouTube channel in 2014, when she was 16 years old. In 2016 and 2017, Dittfach's channel started trending on the website, becoming more prominent to bigger audiences.

Dittfach mainly uploads animated YouTube videos that tell stories about her personal life. The videos often discuss subjects such as toxic relationships, body positivity, anxiety, and depression. She also creates videos centered on her travels and video games, such as Pokémon.

On June 1, 2021, her YouTube channel reached 10 million subscribers. She received a nomination in the Animated category for the 11th Streamy Awards in December 2021. In 2022, she signed with the Creative Artists Agency. In March 2022, Dittfach released her "Being Not Straight" video, in which she came out as aroace. YouTube ranked the video among their list of the "top trending videos" of 2022, as it reached over 17 million views by the end of the year.

Collaborations and other appearances
With fellow YouTuber TheOdd1sOut, Dittfach is a part of the "Animation Squad," a group of animators who frequently create videos together. Her channel is managed by the Channel Frederator multi-channel network.

In December 2017, Dittfach appeared in YouTube Rewind: The Shape of 2017, the first YouTube Rewind installment to include YouTube animators. In September 2018, she received a nomination in the Animated category for the 8th Streamy Awards. In YouTube Rewind 2018: Everyone Controls Rewind, she made an animation featuring PewDiePie's chair.

In March 2019, Dittfach participated in an airsoft gun tournament organized by YouTuber MrBeast and sponsored by game developer Electronic Arts. The event, organized in order to promote the release of Apex Legends, featured 36 players, all of which were prominent YouTube influencers.

In January 2021, Dittfach appeared on YIAY Time: The Game Show, a YouTube Original comedy program hosted by Jack Douglass.

She also frequently appears on the improv game show Scribble Showdown with TheOdd1sOut, Domics, RubberRoss, Egoraptor, and Emirichu.

Philanthropy 
In April 2019, Dittfach published a video encouraging people to donate to Bird Gardens of Naples, a non-profit bird sanctuary in Florida, via a GoFundMe campaign. Within nine weeks, the campaign had raised over $22,000. Dittfach was also among many social media figures who donated to the Team Trees fundraiser in 2019. For World Health Day in April 2020, Dittfach participated in #HopeFromHome, a charity livestream initiated by fellow YouTuber Jacksepticeye that raised over $260,000 for COVID-19 relief.

In October 2021, Dittfach participated in a charity tournament for the video game Nickelodeon All-Star Brawl hosted by YouTuber Alpharad and Coney of the esports organization Panda Global, playing as the character CatDog. In her campaign, she raised over $73,000 after uploading a now-deleted video asking for donations to help choose CatDog as the character she wished to play for the tournament.

Personal life 
Jaiden Dittfach was born on September 27, 1997. In 2016, Dittfach stated in a video that she resides in Arizona. In another video, posted in 2018, she stated that she moved to California.

On March 20, 2022, in her video titled "Being Not Straight", Dittfach came out as aromantic and asexual, also known as "aroace".

Filmography

Animation
 2017: YouTube Rewind: The Shape of 2017
 2018: YouTube Rewind 2018: Everyone Controls Rewind

Voice acting 
 2018: YouTube Rewind 2018: Everyone Controls Rewind as herself

Reality shows
 2020: The Creator Games as herself
 2021: YIAY Time: The Game Show as herself

Discography
 2018: "Empty" (with Boyinaband)
 2021: "Rise Above" (with Rainych)
 2022: "Rise Above (English Version)" (with Rainych and Illberg)
 2022: "Rise Above (Japanese Version)" (with Rainych and Illberg)

Awards and nominations

Notes

References

External links

 
 

1997 births
21st-century LGBT people
American artists of Japanese descent
American YouTubers
Animators from Arizona
Aromantic women
Asexual women
Comedy YouTubers
LGBT animators
American LGBT artists
LGBT YouTubers
Living people
Streamy Award winners
YouTube animators
YouTube channels launched in 2014
YouTube streamers
Gaming YouTubers